Edward Daniel Roberts (born 20 February 1891) was a Welsh professional footballer who played as a half-back. He made appearances in the English Football League for Wrexham, appearing in their inaugural Football League fixture in 1921 against Hartlepools United.

References

1891 births
People from Rhosllanerchrugog
Sportspeople from Wrexham County Borough
Date of death unknown
Welsh footballers
Association football defenders
English Football League players
Chirk AAA F.C. players
Cefn Druids A.F.C. players
Bristol City F.C. players
Wrexham A.F.C. players